Marek Sadowski is a retired Polish association football defender who played professionally in Poland, Finland and the United States

Club
Sadowski spent most of his career in the lower Polish divisions.  In 1990, he  played for Porin Pallo-toverit in the Finnish Ykkönen as they gained promotion to the Veikkausliiga.  Sadowski returned to Poland to play for KS Lublinianka during the winter, then rejoined Porin Pallo-toverit for the 1990 Veikkausliiga season.  He then spent several seasons in Poland.  In 1994, he played for the North Jersey Imperials in the American USISL.

International
Sadowski played one game for the Polish B national team in 1985.

External links
 Sylwetka postaci na 90minut.pl

References

Living people
1959 births
FC Jazz players
KS Lublinianka players
Motor Lublin players
North Jersey Imperials players
Polish footballers
Polish expatriate footballers
Radomiak Radom players
Siarka Tarnobrzeg players
USISL players
Veikkausliiga players
People from Biała Podlaska County
Sportspeople from Lublin Voivodeship
Association football defenders